Juris O. "George" Dancis (28 November 1932 – 20 April 2021) was an Australian basketball player of Latvian descent who represented Australia at the 1956 Summer Olympics.

Born in Latvia, Dancis was raised in the district of Vecāķi. Dancis was married to Liesma, and they had a son, Pēteris. Dancis' younger brother, Miķelis Dancis, was also a member of the Australian Basketball team. Dancis and his family resided in Adelaide, South Australia.

On 13 September 2000, Dancis and his brother Mike were awarded the Australian Sports Medal. In 2006, he was inducted into the Australian Basketball Hall of Fame.

References

1932 births
2021 deaths
Basketball players at the 1956 Summer Olympics
Latvian emigrants to Australia
Olympic basketball players of Australia
Recipients of the Australian Sports Medal
Basketball players from Adelaide
Basketball players from Riga
Latvian World War II refugees